Darío Bottinelli (born December 26, 1986) is an Argentine footballer who plays as an attacking midfielder. He is the younger brother of defender Jonathan Bottinelli.

Career

San Lorenzo
Considered a good prospect for the future, Bottinelli managed to establish himself in the San Lorenzo first team during the 2006-07 season.

Racing
For the start of the 2007-08 season he was transferred to Racing.

Universidad Católica
In early 2008, Bottinelli was transferred to Universidad Católica to compete in the Chilean apertura and the Copa Libertadores.

Atlas
Atlas of Mexico's Primera Division, signed Darío for the Apertura 2008 season, beating powerhouse Club América in the bid for his rights.

Return to Universidad Católica
In the middle of 2010 Darío returned to Universidad Católica, this time on a one-year loan. But he only spent six months in Chile as Atlas negotiated his transfer to Flamengo.

Flamengo
On December 22, 2010, four days before his 24th birthday, Darío signed with Brazilian club Flamengo following the great success of Argentinian players in the Brazilian Série A such as Andrés D'Alessandro and Walter Montillo.

Coritiba
In early 2013, Darío signed with Coritiba after ending his contract with Flamengo

Career statistics
(Correct )

according to combined sources on the Flamengo official website, Flaestatística, soccerway and espn.

Honours
San Lorenzo
 Primera Division Argentina: Clausura 2007

Universidad Católica
 Primera División de Chile: 2010

Flamengo
 Taça Guanabara: 2011
 Taça Rio: 2011
 Rio de Janeiro State League: 2011

References

External links
 

1986 births
Living people
Argentine footballers
Argentine expatriate footballers
Association football midfielders
Argentine Primera División players
Categoría Primera A players
Chilean Primera División players
Liga MX players
Campeonato Brasileiro Série A players
San Lorenzo de Almagro footballers
Racing Club de Avellaneda footballers
Club Deportivo Universidad Católica footballers
Audax Italiano footballers
Atlas F.C. footballers
CR Flamengo footballers
Coritiba Foot Ball Club players
América de Cali footballers
Deportivo Toluca F.C. players
Club de Gimnasia y Esgrima La Plata footballers
Unión de Santa Fe footballers
Club Almagro players
Expatriate footballers in Brazil
Expatriate footballers in Chile
Expatriate footballers in Mexico
Expatriate footballers in Colombia
Argentine expatriate sportspeople in Brazil
Argentine expatriate sportspeople in Chile
Argentine expatriate sportspeople in Mexico
Argentine expatriate sportspeople in Colombia
Footballers from Buenos Aires